Israel Even-Zahav is a former Paralympic athlete from Israel.

Even-Zahav was affected by polio at a young age. In the 1960s he began practicing in athletics, archery and wheelchair basketball at the Israel Sports Center for the Disabled in Ramat Gan.

A member of the national delegation to the 1964 Summer Paralympics, Even-Zahav finished fifth in the discus throw competition and was a member of the gold medal-winning wheelchair basketball team. He was also a member of the wheelchair basketball team in the 1968 Summer Paralympics, also winning a silver medal in athletics (Discus throw) and taking part in shot put, club throw and archery competitions.

He married fellow athlete Neora Helsinger in 1967 .

External links
 

Living people
Paralympic athletes of Israel
Athletes (track and field) at the 1964 Summer Paralympics
Athletes (track and field) at the 1968 Summer Paralympics
Israeli male archers
Paralympic archers of Israel
Archers at the 1968 Summer Paralympics
Paralympic wheelchair basketball players of Israel
Wheelchair basketball players at the 1964 Summer Paralympics
Wheelchair basketball players at the 1968 Summer Paralympics
Paralympic gold medalists for Israel
Paralympic silver medalists for Israel
Wheelchair category Paralympic competitors
Medalists at the 1964 Summer Paralympics
Medalists at the 1968 Summer Paralympics
Track and field athletes with disabilities
Israeli male discus throwers
Israeli men's wheelchair basketball players
Year of birth missing (living people)
Paralympic medalists in wheelchair basketball
Paralympic medalists in athletics (track and field)
Paralympic discus throwers